Apophatus is a genus of moths in the family Palaephatidae. It was described by Donald R. Davis in 1986.

Species
 Apophatus parvus Davis, 1986
 Apophatus bifibratus Davis, 1986

References

Palaephatidae
Monotrysia genera